The 1996 India Open was a men's tennis tournament played on outdoor hard courts in New Delhi in India and was part of the World Series of the 1996 ATP Tour. It was the inaugural edition of the tournament and took place from 8 April through 14 April 1996. Thomas Enqvist won the singles title.

Finals

Singles

 Thomas Enqvist defeated  Byron Black 6–2, 7–6(7–3)
 It was Enqvist's 1st title of the year and the 8th of his career.

Doubles

 Jonas Björkman /  Nicklas Kulti defeated  Byron Black /  Sandon Stolle 4–6, 6–4, 6–4
 It was Björkman's 2nd title of the year and the 12th of his career. It was Kulti's 2nd title of the year and the 7th of his career.

References

External links
 Official website
 ATP tournament profile

 
India Open
Chennai Open
India Open
Sport in New Delhi